Ibn al-ʿArabī may refer to:

Ibn Arabi (1165–1240), Andalusi Muslim philosopher
Abu Bakr ibn al-Arabi (1076–1148), Andalusi Muslim scholar of Maliki jurisprudence

See also
 Ibn al-A'rabi, (ca. 760 – 846), philologist, genealogist, and oral traditionist of Arabic tribal poetry